American Man: Greatest Hits Volume II is the ninth album, and the second compilation album released by country singer Trace Adkins. It was released on December 4, 2007. Adkins was originally scheduled to release a new studio album on that day but said in a press release: "We were already under some extremely tight deadlines as it was to make the street week," said Adkins. "I just was not able to get it all done because, to be honest, a pressing career opportunity came my way that I really wanted to take advantage of. As a result, I simply ran out of time."

The album features three new songs, including the lead single "I Got My Game On", which was later utilized as the theme song to Howie Long's Tough Guys show during the FOX Super Bowl XLII pre-game show. "You're Gonna Miss This" was the album's second single. As the fastest-climbing single of his career, it was also his longest-lasting Number One, spending three weeks at that position on the Billboard country charts, in addition to reaching the Top 20 both on the Billboard Hot 100 and Pop 100 charts.

The album debuted at number 22 on the U.S. Billboard 200 chart, selling about 53,000 copies in its first week.

Track listing

Personnel on New Tracks
Trace Adkins- lead vocals
Mike Brignardello- bass guitar 
Pat Buchanan- electric guitar (track 12)
J.T. Corenflos- electric guitar
Eric Darken- percussion
Shannon Forrest- drums (track 12)
Kenny Greenberg- baritone guitar (track 2), electric guitar (tracks 2, 3)
Paul Franklin- steel guitar
Aubrey Haynie- fiddle (tracks 2, 12), mandolin (track 3)
Wes Hightower- background vocals
B. James Lowry- acoustic guitar (tracks 2, 3)
Greg Morrow- drums (tracks 2, 3)
Gordon Mote- Hammond organ (tracks 2, 12), keyboards (track 3), piano (tracks 2, 3)
Bryan Sutton- banjo (track 12), 12-string guitar (track 12), acoustic guitar (track 12)

Chart performance

Weekly charts

Year-end charts

Singles

Certifications

References

2007 greatest hits albums
Albums produced by Frank Rogers (record producer)
Trace Adkins albums
Capitol Records compilation albums